In the structural hierarchy of the administrative divisions in the Republic of China (Taiwan), there are three types of administrative divisions under its territorial control with the Mandarin word shì (市, "city") in their names.

There are 23 cities on the island of Taiwan. Most of them are located within Taiwan Province:

City-Gallery Largest cities of Taiwan

Former cities

Dissolved prefectural cities

Dissolved provincial cities

Dissolved county-administered cities

Alphabetical list of all cities and townships 
List of all cities and townships in the Republic of China, consisting of six special municipalities and two provinces without administrative function.
For the subdivisions under special municipalities and cities, see District (Taiwan)
For the subdivisions sort by county, see Township (Taiwan)

A 
 Alishan (阿里山) Chiayi County

B 
 Baisha (白沙) Penghu County
 Baozhong (褒忠) Yunlin County
 Baoshan (寳山) Hsinchu County
 Beidou (北斗) Changhua County
 Beigan (北竿) Lienchiang County
 Beigang (北港) Yunlin County
 Beinan (卑南) Taitung County
 Beipu (北埔) Hsinchu County
 Budai (布袋) Chiayi County

C 
 Caotun (草屯) Nantou County
 Changbin (長濱) Taitung County
 Changhua [Zhanghua] (彰化) Changhua County
 Changzhi (長治) Pingtung County
 Chaozhou (潮州) Pingtung County
 Checheng (車城) Pingtung County
 Chenggong (成功) Taitung County
 Chiayi [Jiayi] (嘉義)
 Chishang (池上) Taitung County
 Chunri (春日) Pingtung County
 Cimei (七美) Penghu County
 Citong (莿桐) Yunlin County

D 
 Dacheng (大城) Changhua County
 Dacun (大村) Changhua County
 Dahu (大湖) Miaoli County
 Dalin (大林) Chiayi County
 Dapi (大埤) Yunlin County
 Dapu (大埔) Chiayi County
 Daren (達仁) Taitung County
 Datong (大同) Yilan County
 Dawu (大武) Taitung County
 Donggang (東港) Pingtung County
 Donghe (東河) Taitung County
 Dongshan (冬山) Yilan County
 Dongshi (東石) Chiayi County
 Dongshi (東勢) Yunlin County
 Dongyin (東引) Lienchiang County
 Douliu (斗六) Yunlin County
 Dounan (斗南) Yunlin County

E 
 Emei (峨眉) Hsinchu County
 Erlin (二林) Changhua County
 Erlun (二崙) Yunlin County
 Ershui (二水) Changhua County

F 
 Fangliao (枋寮) Pingtung County
 Fangshan (枋山) Pingtung County
 Fangyuan (芳苑) Changhua County
 Fanlu (番路) Chiayi County
 Fengbin (豐濱) Hualien County
 Fenglin (鳳林) Hualien County
 Fenyuan (芬園) Changhua County
 Fuli (富里) Hualien County
 Fuxing (福興) Changhua County

G 
 Gaoshu (高樹) Pingtung County
 Gongguan (公館) Miaoli County
 Guangfu (光復) Hualien County
 Guanshan (關山) Taitung County
 Guanxi (關西) Hsinchu County
 Gukeng (古坑) Yunlin County
 Guoxing (國姓) Nantou County

H 
 Haiduan (海端) Taitung County
 Hemei (和美) Changhua County
 Hengchun (恆春) Pingtung County
 Hengshan (橫山) Hsinchu County
 Houlong (後龍) Miaoli County
 Hsinchu [Xinzhu] (新竹)
 Hualien [Hualian] (花蓮) Hualien County
 Huatan (花壇) Changhua County
 Hukou (湖口) Hsinchu County
 Huwei (虎尾) Yunlin County
 Huxi (湖西) Penghu County

J 
 Jiadong (佳冬) Pingtung County
 Ji'an (吉安) Hualien County
 Jianshi (尖石) Hsinchu County
 Jiaoxi (礁溪) Yilan County
 Jiji (集集) Nantou County
 Jincheng (金城) Kinmen County
 Jinfeng (金峰) Taitung County
 Jinhu (金湖) Kinmen County
 Jinning (金寧) Kinmen County
 Jinsha (金沙) Kinmen County
 Jiuru (九如) Pingtung County
 Juguang (莒光) Lienchiang County

K 
 Kanding (崁頂) Pingtung County
 Kaohsiung [Gaoxiong] (高雄)
 Keelung [Jilong] (基隆)
 Kouhu (口湖) Yunlin County

L 
 Laiyi (來義) Pingtung County
 Lanyu (蘭嶼) Taitung County
 Lieyu (烈嶼) Kinmen County
 Ligang (里港) Pingtung County
 Linbian (林邊) Pingtung County
 Linluo (麟洛) Pingtung County
 Linnei (林内) Yunlin County
 Lioujiao (六腳) Chiayi County
 Liuqiu (琉球) Pingtung County
 Lucao (鹿草) Chiayi County
 Lüdao (綠島) Taitung County
 Lugu (鹿谷) Nantou County
 Lukang [Lugang] (鹿港) Changhua County
 Lunbei (崙背) Yunlin County
 Luodong (羅東) Yilan County
 Luye (鹿野) Taitung County

M 
 Mailiao (麥寮) Yunlin County
 Majia (瑪家) Pingtung County
 Magong (馬公) Penghu County
 Manzhou (滿州) Pingtung County
 Meishan (梅山) Chiayi County
 Miaoli (苗栗) Miaoli County
 Mingjian (名間) Nantou County
 Minxiong (民雄) Chiayi County
 Mudan (牡丹) Pingtung County

N 
 Nan'ao (南澳) Yilan County
 Nangan (南竿) Lienchiang County
 Nantou (南投) Nantou County
 Nanzhou (南州) Pingtung County
 Nanzhuang (南庄) Miaoli County
 Neipu (内埔) Pingtung County
 New Taipei [Xinbei] (新北)

P 
 Pingtung [Pingdong] (屏東) Pingtung County
 Pitou (埤頭) Changhua County
 Puli (埔里) Nantou County
 Puxin (埔心) Changhua County
 Puyan (埔鹽) Changhua County
 Puzi (朴子) Chiayi County

Q 
 Qionglin (芎林) Hsinchu County

R 
 Ren'ai (仁愛) Nantou County
 Ruisui (瑞穗) Hualien County

S 
 Sandimen (三地門) Pingtung County
 Sanwan (三灣) Miaoli County
 Sanxing (三星) Yilan County
 Sanyi (三義) Miaoli County
 Shengang (伸港) Changhua County
 Shetou (社頭) Changhua County
 Shitan (獅潭) Miaoli County
 Shizi (獅子) Pingtung County
 Shoufeng (壽豐) Hualien County
 Shuili (水里) Nantou County
 Shuilin (水林) Yunlin County
 Shuishang (水上) Chiayi County
 Sihu (四湖) Yunlin County
 Su'ao (蘇澳) Yilan County

T 
 Tai'an (泰安) Miaoli County
 Taibao (太保) Chiayi County
 Taichung [Taizhong] (臺中)
 Taimali (太麻里) Taitung County
 Tainan (臺南)
 Taipei [Taibei] (臺北)
 Taitung [Taidong] (臺東) Taitung County
 Taiwu (泰武) Pingtung County
 Taixi (臺西) Yunlin County
 Taoyuan (桃園)
 Tianwei (田尾) Changhua County
 Tianzhong (田中) Changhua County
 Tongluo (銅鑼) Miaoli County
 Tongxiao (通霄) Miaoli County
 Toucheng (頭城) Yilan County
 Toufen (頭份) Miaoli County
 Touwu (頭屋) Miaoli County
 Tuku (土庫) Yunlin County

W 
 Wandan (萬丹) Pingtung County
 Wangan (望安) Penghu County
 Wanluan (萬巒) Pingtung County
 Wanrong (萬榮) Hualien County
 Wufeng (五峰) Hsinchu County
 Wujie (五結) Yilan County
 Wuqiu (烏坵) Kinmen County
 Wutai (霧臺) Pingtung County

X 
 Xianxi (線西) Changhua County
 Xihu (溪湖) Changhua County
 Xihu (西湖) Miaoli County
 Xikou (溪口) Chiayi County
 Xiluo (西螺) Yunlin County
 Xincheng (新城) Hualien County
 Xinfeng (新豐) Hsinchu County
 Xingang (新港) Chiayi County
 Xinpi (新埤) Pingtung County
 Xinpu (新埔) Hsinchu County
 Xinyi (信義) Nantou County
 Xinyuan (新園) Pingtung County
 Xiulin (秀林) Hualien County
 Xiushui (秀水) Changhua County
 Xiyu (西嶼) Penghu County
 Xizhou (溪州) Changhua County

Y 
 Yanping (延平) Taitung County
 Yanpu (鹽埔) Pingtung County
 Yilan (宜蘭) Yilan County
 Yizhu (義竹) Chiayi County
 Yongjing (永靖) Changhua County
 Yuanchang (元長) Yunlin County
 Yuanli (苑裡) Miaoli County
 Yuanlin (員林) Changhua County
 Yuanshan (員山) Yilan County
 Yuchi (魚池) Nantou County
 Yuli (玉里) Hualien County

Z 
 Zaoqiao (造橋) Miaoli County
 Zhongliao (中寮) Nantou County
 Zhongpu (中埔) Chiayi County
 Zhuangwei (壯圍) Yilan County
 Zhubei (竹北) Hsinchu County
 Zhudong (竹東) Hsinchu County
 Zhunan (竹南) Miaoli County
 Zhuolan (卓蘭) Miaoli County
 Zhuoxi (卓溪) Hualien County
 Zhuqi (竹崎) Chiayi County
 Zhushan (竹山) Nantou County
 Zhutang (竹塘) Changhua County
 Zhutian (竹田) Pingtung County

Alphabetical list of all cities and townships (Tongyòng Pinyin) 

Tongyòng Pinyin was the standard of Chinese romanization of Taiwan between 2002 and 2008. Although the standard was shifted to Hànyǔ Pīnyīn from 1 January 2009, the change to signs and documents using Tongyòng Pinyin is not complete. There are still some signs using Tongyòng Pinyin on highways and roads.

A 
 Alishan (阿里山) Chiayi County

B 
 Baisha (白沙) Penghu County
 Baojhong (褒忠) Yunlin County
 Baoshan (寶山) Hsinchu County
 Beidou (北斗) Changhua County
 Beigan (北竿) Lienchiang County
 Beigang (北港) Yunlin County
 Beinan (卑南) Taitung County
 Beipu (北埔) Hsinchu County
 Budai (布袋) Chiayi County

C 
 Caotun (草屯) Nantou County
 Changbin (長濱) Taitung County
 Changhua [Jhanghua] (彰化) Changhua County
 Changjhih (長治) Pingtung County
 Chaojhou (潮州) Pingtung County
 Checheng (車城) Pingtung County
 Chenggong (成功) Taitung County
 Chiayi [Jiayi] (嘉義)
 Chihshang (池上) Taitung County
 Chunrih (春日) Pingtung County
 Cihtong (莿桐) Yunlin County
 Cimei (七美) Penghu County
 Cyonglin (芎林) Hsinchu County

D 
 Dacheng (大城) Changhua County
 Dacun (大村) Changhua County
 Dahu (大湖) Miaoli County
 Dalin (大林) Chiayi County
 Dapi (大埤) Yunlin County
 Dapu (大埔) Chiayi County
 Daren (達仁) Taitung County
 Datong (大同) Yilan County
 Dawu (大武) Taitung County
 Donggang (東港) Pingtung County
 Donghe (東河) Taitung County
 Dongshan (冬山) Yilan County
 Dongshih (東石) Chiayi County
 Dongshih (東勢) Yunlin County
 Dongyin (東引) Lienchiang County
 Douliou (斗六) Yunlin County
 Dounan (斗南) Yunlin County

E 
 Emei (峨眉) Hsinchu County
 Erlin (二林) Changhua County
 Erlun (二崙) Yunlin County
 Ershuei (二水) Changhua County

F 
 Fangliao (枋寮) Pingtung County
 Fangshan (枋山) Pingtung County
 Fangyuan (芳苑) Changhua County
 Fanlu (番路) Chiayi County
 Fenyuan (芬園) Changhua County
 Fongbin (豐濱) Hualien County
 Fonglin (鳳林) Hualien County
 Fuli (富里) Hualien County
 Fusing (福興) Changhua County

G 
 Gaoshu (高樹) Pingtung County
 Gongguan (公館) Miaoli County
 Guangfu (光復) Hualien County
 Guanshan (關山) Taitung County
 Guansi (關西) Hsinchu County
 Gukeng (古坑) Yunlin County
 Guosing (國姓) Nantou County

H 
 Haiduan (海端) Taitung County
 Hemei (和美) Changhua County
 Hengchun (恆春) Pingtung County
 Hengshan (橫山) Hsinchu County
 Houlong (後龍) Miaoli County
 Hsinchu [Sinjhu] (新竹)
 Hualien [Hualian] (花蓮) Hualien County
 Huatan (花壇) Changhua County
 Hukou (湖口) Hsinchu County
 Husi (湖西) Penghu County
 Huwei (虎尾) Yunlin County

J 
 Jhongliao (中寮) Nantou County
 Jhongpu (中埔) Chiayi County
 Jhubei (竹北) Hsinchu County
 Jhuci (竹崎) Chiayi County
 Jhudong (竹東) Hsinchu County
 Jhunan (竹南) Miaoli County
 Jhuolan (卓蘭) Miaoli County
 Jhuosi (卓溪) Hualien County
 Jhushan (竹山) Nantou County
 Jhutang (竹塘) Changhua County
 Jhutian (竹田) Pingtung County
 Jiadong (佳冬) Pingtung County
 Ji-an (吉安) Hualien County
 Jianshih (尖石) Hsinchu County
 Jiaosi (礁溪) Yilan County
 Jiji (集集) Nantou County
 Jincheng (金城) Kinmen County
 Jinfong (金峰) Taitung County
 Jinhu (金湖) Kinmen County
 Jinning (金寧) Kinmen County
 Jinsha (金沙) Kinmen County
 Jiouru (九如) Pingtung County
 Jyuguang (莒光) Lienchiang County

K 
 Kanding (崁頂) Pingtung County
 Kaohsiung [Gaosyong] (高雄)
 Keelung [Jilong] (基隆)
 Kouhu (口湖) Yunlin County

L 
 Laiyi (來義) Pingtung County
 Lanyu (蘭嶼) Taitung County
 Lieyu (烈嶼) Kinmen County
 Ligang (里港) Pingtung County
 Linbian (林邊) Pingtung County
 Linluo (麟洛) Pingtung County
 Linnei (林內) Yunlin County
 Lioujiao (六腳) Chiayi County
 Liouciou (琉球) Pingtung County
 Lucao (鹿草) Chiayi County
 Lugu (鹿谷) Nantou County
 Lukang [Lugang] (鹿港) Changhua County
 Lunbei (崙背) Yunlin County
 Luodong (羅東) Yilan County
 Luye (鹿野) Taitung County
 Lyudao (綠島) Taitung County

M 
 Mailiao (麥寮) Yunlin County
 Majia (瑪家) Pingtung County
 Magong (馬公) Penghu County
 Manjhou (滿州) Pingtung County
 Meishan (梅山) Chiayi County
 Miaoli (苗栗) Miaoli County
 Mingjian (名間) Nantou County
 Minxiong (民雄) Chiayi County
 Mudan (牡丹) Pingtung County

N 
 Nan-ao (南澳) Yilan County
 Nangan (南竿) Lienchiang County
 Nanjhou (南州) Pingtung County
 Nanjhuang (南庄) Miaoli County
 Nantou (南投) Nantou County
 Neipu (內埔) Pingtung County
 New Taipei [Sinbei] (新北)

P 
 Pingtung [Pingdong] (屏東) Pingtung County
 Pitou (埤頭) Changhua County
 Puli (埔里) Nantou County
 Pusin (埔心) Changhua County
 Puyan (埔鹽) Changhua County
 Puzih (朴子) Chiayi County

R 
 Ren-ai (仁愛) Nantou County
 Rueisuei (瑞穗) Hualien County

S 
 Sandimen (三地門) Pingtung County
 Sansing (三星) Yilan County
 Sanwan (三灣) Miaoli County
 Sanyi (三義) Miaoli County
 Shengang (伸港) Changhua County
 Shetou (社頭) Changhua County
 Shihtan (獅潭) Miaoli County
 Shihzih (獅子) Pingtung County
 Shoufong (壽豐) Hualien County
 Shueilin (水林) Yunlin County
 Shueili (水里) Nantou County
 Shueishang (水上) Chiayi County
 Siansi (線西) Changhua County
 Sihhu (四湖) Yunlin County
 Sihu (溪湖) Changhua County
 Sihu (西湖) Miaoli County
 Sijhou (溪州) Changhua County
 Sikou (溪口) Chiayi County
 Siluo (西螺) Yunlin County
 Sincheng (新城) Hualien County
 Sinfong (新豐) Hsinchu County
 Singang (新港) Chiayi County
 Sinpi (新埤) Pingtung County
 Sinpu (新埔) Hsinchu County
 Sinyi (信義) Nantou County
 Sinyuan (新園) Pingtung County
 Sioushuei (秀水) Changhua County
 Sioulin (秀林) Hualien County
 Siyu (西嶼) Penghu County
 Su-ao (蘇澳) Yilan County

T 
 Tai-an (泰安) Miaoli County
 Taibao (太保) Chiayi County
 Taichung [Taijhong] (臺中)
 Taimali (太麻里) Taitung County
 Tainan (臺南)
 Taipei [Taibei] (臺北)
 Taisi (臺西) Yunlin County
 Taitung [Taidong] (臺東) Taitung County
 Taiwu (泰武) Pingtung County
 Taoyuan (桃園)
 Tianjhong (田中) Changhua County
 Tianwei (田尾) Changhua County
 Tongluo (銅鑼) Miaoli County
 Tongsiao (通霄) Miaoli County
 Toucheng (頭城) Yilan County
 Toufen (頭份) Miaoli County
 Touwu (頭屋) Miaoli County
 Tuku (土庫) Yunlin County

W 
 Wandan (萬丹) Pingtung County
 Wang-an (望安) Penghu County
 Wanluan (萬巒) Pingtung County
 Wanrong (萬榮) Hualien County
 Wufong (五峰) Hsinchu County
 Wujie (五結) Yilan County
 Wuciou (烏坵) Kinmen County
 Wutai (霧臺) Pingtung County

Y 
 Yanping (延平) Taitung County
 Yanpu (鹽埔) Pingtung County
 Yijhu (義竹) Chiayi County
 Yilan (宜蘭) Yilan County
 Yongjing (永靖) Changhua County
 Yuanchang (元長) Yunlin County
 Yuanli (苑裡) Miaoli County
 Yuanlin (員林) Changhua County
 Yuanshan (員山) Yilan County
 Yuchih (魚池) Nantou County
 Yuli (玉里) Hualien County

Z 
 Zaociao (造橋) Miaoli County

See also
 List of metropolitan areas in Taiwan
 Administrative divisions of Taiwan
 List of administrative divisions of Taiwan
 Lists of cities by country
 List of metropolitan areas by population

Historical
History of the administrative divisions of China (1912–1949)
List of cities in China

References

 
Taiwan
Cities